Neil Kennedy O'Donnell (born July 3, 1966) is an American former professional football player who was a quarterback in the National Football League (NFL) for 14 seasons. He played college football at Maryland and was selected by the Pittsburgh Steelers in the third round of the 1990 NFL Draft. During his six seasons with the Steelers, O'Donnell received Pro Bowl honors and helped lead them to a Super Bowl appearance in Super Bowl XXX. After leaving Pittsburgh, he was a member of the New York Jets for two seasons and the Cincinnati Bengals for one. O'Donnell spent his last five seasons mostly as a backup with the Tennessee Titans.

Early life
O'Donnell grew up in Madison, New Jersey, and played high school football there at Madison High School. Neil Kennedy O’Donnell was born July 3, 1966 in Morristown, New Jersey. Neil's four older brothers played for local coaching legend Ted Monica and won state championships. Stephen O’Donnell was an All-State quarterback who went on to play for Duke. Coach Monica had retired by the time Neil enrolled at Madison High School, but mentored him throughout much of his young football life.  O'Donnell was the star of the Dodgers varsity team as a sophomore and junior, but the team won just three games in those two seasons. During his senior year, as quarterback, O'Donnell led the team to a respectable 4-2-3 season in 1985. Coach Bobby Ross recruited him to the University of Maryland despite lacking the stats and honors of other high school stars.

College career
At the University of Maryland, O'Donnell redshirted the 1986 season, then played for the Terrapins for three seasons and was the starting quarterback in the 1988 and 1989. He played under head coach Joe Krivak, who was promoted from quarterback coach after Bobby Ross left the program in 1986. The Krivak era was marked by mediocre results and the O'Donnell years featured an especially tough out-of-conference schedule. The Terps finished 5-6 in 1988 and 3-7-1 in 1989, notably tying Penn State, only the second time Maryland had avoided losing to the Nittany Lions in the series up to that point. The Terps failed to reach a bowl game during O'Donnell's career there. He was backed up by QB Scott Zolak, who pushed O'Donnell for playing time during both of his seasons as a starter. O'Donnell wore #14 for the Terps and for most of his Pro Career. He was awarded the Ray Krouse Award for Maryland team MVP in 1989, and finished his Maryland career with 26 touchdown passes, 3 rushing touchdowns, and 5,069 total yards.

Professional career

Pittsburgh Steelers
O'Donnell was drafted by the Pittsburgh Steelers with the 70th overall pick in the 1990 NFL draft. After sitting on the bench for his entire rookie season, he started in eight games during 1991 before becoming the team's primary in 1992.

In the 1992 NFL season, O'Donnell threw for 2,283 passing yards, 13 touchdowns, and 9 interceptions, receiving the only Pro Bowl selection of his career. In perhaps his best regular season game of the year, O’Donnell scored three touchdowns (two passing, one rushing) in a 23-6 victory over the San Diego Chargers. The Steelers finished 11-5 and took the AFC Central division title, but lost to the Buffalo Bills 24-3 in a divisional playoff game.

In 1993, he had another great season, throwing for a career-high 3,208 passing yards, 14 touchdowns, and 7 interceptions finishing with a 1.4 interception percentage, the second lowest in his career.

O'Donnell led the Steelers to Super Bowl XXX, but threw two interceptions to Dallas Cowboys cornerback Larry Brown to set up short touchdown drives in the second half. He became a free agent at the end of the season.

New York Jets
The Steelers made an offer to O'Donnell, however on February 29, 1996, he signed a 5-year $25 million contract with the New York Jets. He went 0–6 in his first season as starter before suffering a season-ending shoulder injury, despite throwing for 292 or more yards in three of these starts. His performance improved the following season under new coach Bill Parcells the following year. He eventually fell out of favor with Parcells and lost his starting job to Glenn Foley. O'Donnell refused to re-negotiate his contract, which paid him $6.65M for the upcoming season, Parcells chose to waive O'Donnell.

Cincinnati Bengals
On July 7, 1998, O'Donnell signed a 4-year $17M contract with the Cincinnati Bengals. In the 1998 NFL season, with the then-1–3 Bengals, O'Donnell threw a 25-yard touchdown pass to Carl Pickens with 20 seconds remaining to score the winning touchdown against 3–1 Pittsburgh. O'Donnell's 90.2 passer rating was sixth among regular starting quarterbacks in the NFL and third in the AFC. However, due to a struggling defense, the Bengals went on to finish 3–13. O'Donnell was released at the end of the season to make room for rookie quarterback Akili Smith.

Tennessee Titans
On July 24, 1999, O'Donnell signed a multi-year contract with the Tennessee Titans, where he served as Steve McNair's backup. He performed well, winning four of his five starts for an injured McNair in 1999, leaving a perennial .500 team at 5–1 upon McNair's return. Later, O'Donnell came off the bench and led Tennessee to a 47–36 victory over Pittsburgh in Week 17 en route to the AFC Championship and Super Bowl XXXIV, in which he was not an active participant.

O'Donnell retired after the 2002 season, but was talked into coming back for one game in December 2003 when McNair and Billy Volek were injured. He started in the regular season finale and delivered a strong performance, completing 18 of 27 passes for 232 yards and two touchdowns, leading the Titans to a 33–13 victory over the Tampa Bay Buccaneers.

O'Donnell ended his career with the lowest interception percentage in NFL history, averaging just 2.11 interceptions for every 100 pass attempts. Aaron Rodgers has since eclipsed the record (1.46 interception percentage through the 2018–19 season). O'Donnell also wore number 14 during most of his career except during his one-year stint with the Bengals, where he wore number 12. The Bengals did not issue number 14 after the retirement of former quarterback and West Coast offense pioneer Ken Anderson in 1986 until Andy Dalton started wearing number 14 for the Bengals in 2011.

Post football career
O'Donnell permanently retired after the 2003 season. In 2004, he declined head coach Bill Cowher's offer to return to the Steelers after starting quarterback Tommy Maddox and backup quarterback Charlie Batch both sustained injuries.

O'Donnell found work as a sports analyst, primarily covering the Titans at WTVF, Nashville's CBS affiliate (2005–2007). He is currently a sales representative for FieldTurf in Kentucky and Tennessee.

References

External links

American football quarterbacks
Players of American football from New Jersey
Maryland Terrapins football players
1966 births
Living people
Pittsburgh Steelers players
New York Jets players
Cincinnati Bengals players
Tennessee Titans players
American Conference Pro Bowl players
People from Madison, New Jersey
People from Morristown, New Jersey
Sportspeople from Morris County, New Jersey
Madison High School (New Jersey) alumni